Clara Chung (born October 31, 1987), known by her stage name CLARA (previously Clara C),  is an American singer-songwriter, producer and composer. She is a music artist who rose to fame on Youtube when she won numerous talent competitions in a row including JC Penney's Talent Search, Los Angeles’ Kollaboration 10, KAC Media Juice Night, and ISA 2009. CLARA is a self-taught multi-instrumentalist who writes, produces, and directs her own content. CLARA's sweet, sultry vocals paired with soul-stirring music make her an artist to remember. CLARA has independently sold out tours worldwide and has performed at the Hollywood Bowl, Walt Disney Concert Hall, and for the White House's U.S. Department of Education. CLARA's music has been featured in commercials, Film & TV (Netflix's Big Mouth) and can be heard in public spaces all around the globe. CLARA also composes for cosmetics industry titan Bobbi Brown.

Early life and education 

Chung was born in New York on October 31, 1987 to South Korean-born parents who currently reside in Northridge, California.

Chung graduated from the University of California, Irvine with a Bachelor of Arts degree in psychology and a minor in Education in 2010 and is currently enrolled in a graduate program for Psychology at Pepperdine University. She is now a full-time professional music artist, but had taught children with autism prior to all her music endeavors.

Career 

In a 2011 interview after the release of her first album, Chung said that she initially was not particularly motivated to post videos of her singing and guitar playing on YouTube, but was encouraged by her friends to try it out. Chung describes the music in her album, The Art in My Heart, as being diverse and "taking on a lot of different sounds." "There are songs that are very much like Sara Bareilles and others that are more like Coldplay. And there are other songs that I can't categorize. I guess if you want to sum up influences, I’d say definitely Sara Bareilles, John Mayer, Feist."

In 2010, Chung won the Kollaboration LA competition after writing her first hit original song "Offbeat", and performing it at the competition held at the Shrine located near University of Southern California.

In April 2010, Chung worked with other popular artists such as rappers Dumbfoundead and Jay Park.

In September 2010, she released her album Art in My Heart in conjunction with her music video for the lead single "Offbeat".  The video for "Offbeat" was directed by viral video director Ross Ching (of Kina Grannis' "Valentine" music video fame) and produced by Don Le of Fusion3Films.  The concept for the video was Chung singing amongst inspiring visuals in a world filled with bubbles.  It has amassed over 13,000,000 unique YouTube views so far. DJ Descry and My Parasol have produced the only known remixes to date. In 2011, director Ross Ching and producer Don Le followed up with a second music video, "The Camel Song".  The video featured YouTube personality, Nigahiga, as her love interest.

In February 2011, Chung announced her Loveprint mini-tour (March–April) in which she makes stops in Los Angeles, Boston, Seattle and San Diego.

On June 6, 2011 on an interview with Robert Herrera of Front Row Live Entertainment, Chung stated that she is currently writing a new album.

On September 15, Chung released her 2nd Album titled esc.

Chung also toured with David Choi on their Fall Tour presented by YesStyle, visiting 19 different cities from Canada and the United States.

On September 30, Chung released her acoustic album Organika, and in October toured the United States and Canada, visiting 14 cities. This tour was an acoustic tour that is based on her album Organika.

Chung and her husband were featured in Andy Grammer's music video for "Honey I'm Good."

Discography

Studio albums

References

External links

Living people
American musicians of Korean descent
American people of South Korean descent
1987 births
American women singer-songwriters
Singer-songwriters from California
Guitarists from Los Angeles
21st-century American singers
21st-century American women singers
21st-century American women guitarists
21st-century American guitarists
American YouTubers
University of California, Irvine alumni
Musicians from New York City
Singer-songwriters from New York (state)